Zou Yan (305 BC240 BC) was a Chinese Warring States-era philosopher and spiritual writer best known as the representative thinker of the Yin and Yang School (or School of Naturalists) during the Hundred Schools of Thought era in Chinese philosophy.

Biography
Zou Yan was a noted scholar of the Jixia Academy in the state of Qi. The British biochemist and sinologist, Joseph Needham, describes Zou as "The real founder of all Chinese scientific thought." His teachings combined and systematized two current theories during the Warring States period: Yin-Yang and the Five Elements/Phases (wood, fire, earth, metal, and water).
All of Zou Yan's writings have been lost and are only known through quotations in early Chinese texts. The best information comes from his brief biography in the Records of the Grand Historian (1st century BC) by Sima Qian. It describes him as a polymath (philosopher, historian, politician, naturalist, geographer, astrologer) who came from the coastal state of Qi (present day Shandong), where he was a member of the state-sponsored Jixia Academy. Needham writes:

Zou Yan is commonly associated with Daoism and the origins of Chinese alchemy, going back to the (ca. 100 AD) Book of Han that calls him a fangshi (方士 [literally "technique master"] "alchemist; magician; exorcist; diviner"). Holmes Welch proposes the fangshi were among those whom Sima Qian described as "unable to practice" Zou Yan's arts, and says while Zou "gradually acquired alchemistical stature, he himself knew nothing of the art. It was probably developed by those of his followers who became interested in physical experimentation with the Five Elements."

See also
Jiuzhou

References

Further reading
 Fung Yu-lun (1952). History of Chinese Philosophy. Vol. 1. p. 159-69.

305 BC births
240 BC deaths
3rd-century BC Chinese philosophers
Chinese spiritual writers
Philosophers from Shandong
Writers from Shandong
Zhou dynasty philosophers
Zhou dynasty Taoists